David George Haskell  is a British and American biologist, writer, and William R. Kenan Jr. Professor of Biology and Environmental Studies at Sewanee: The University of the South, in Sewanee, Tennessee. In addition to scientific papers, he has written essays, poems, op-eds, and the books The Forest Unseen (Viking Press, Penguin Random House 2012), The Songs of Trees (Viking Press, Penguin Random House 2017), Thirteen Ways to Smell a Tree (Hachette), and Sounds Wild and Broken (Viking Press, Penguin Random House 2022).

Education
Haskell received his B.A. in zoology from the University of Oxford and his Ph.D. in evolutionary biology from Cornell University.

Work
The Forest Unseen: A Year's Watch in Nature was winner of the 2013 National Academies Communication Award for Best Book, finalist for the 2013 Pulitzer Prize in General Nonfiction, runner-up for the 2013 PEN/E. O. Wilson Literary Science Writing Award, winner of the 2012 National Outdoor Book Award for Natural History Literature, and the 2013 Reed Environmental Writing Award. Biologist E. O. Wilson wrote that the book was "…a new genre of nature writing, located between science and poetry". Outside Magazine listed the book among those that "shaped the decade", stating that it "injects much-needed vibrancy into the stuffy world of nature writing". The Forest Unseen has been translated into twelve languages and was winner, in translation, of the 2016 Dapeng Nature Book Award in China.

The Songs of Trees: Stories from Nature's Great Connectors, was published in April 2017 by Viking. It won the 2018 John Burroughs Medal for Distinguished Natural History Writing and the Iris Books Award. Jurors for the Iris Award called The Songs of Trees “a compelling example of poetic science” that “beautifully illustrates the interconnections … of particular trees around the world, weaving together scientific knowledge about them and their relationships to the rest of the natural world including humans." Public Radio International's Science Friday named The Songs of Trees of the Best Science Books of 2017, Maria Popova included the book in Brain Pickings Favorite Science Books of 2017, writing that Haskell is "the rare kind of scientist Rachel Carson was when long ago she pioneered a new cultural aesthetic of poetic prose about science", and Forbes.com named the book one of 10 Best Environment, Climate Science and Conservation Books of 2017. The Songs of Trees has been translated into fourteen languages.

Cynthia Barnett reviewing in The New York Times, wrote of Haskell's, Sounds Wild and Broken, that it "affirms Haskell as a laureate for the earth". The book was a Finalist for the 2023 PEN/ E. O. Wilson Literary Science Writing Award and an Editor's Choice in the New York Times book review.

Thirteen Ways to Smell a Tree was described by Sir Peter Crane, FRS, as "'eclectic, brilliant and beautifully written" and by Kate Humble in The Radio Times Best Books of 2021 as "My favourite book of the year".  

Journalist Paul Kvinta's profile of Haskell in Outside Magazine was included in the 2018 anthology Best American Science and Nature Writing, edited by Sam Kean.

Awards and honors
In 2009 he was named the Carnegie-CASE Professor of the Year in Tennessee. He was awarded a Guggenheim Fellowship by the John Simon Guggenheim Memorial Foundation in 2014.

In 2022, Haskell was elected a fellow of the Linnean Society of London. He is also a fellow of the American Council of Learned Societies and elected member of the American Ornithological Society.

Bibliography 
Books
The Forest Unseen: A Year's Watch in Nature, (Viking Books hardcover edition 2012, Penguin paperback edition 2013)
 The Songs of Trees: Stories from Nature's Great Connectors, (Viking Books hardcover edition 2017, Penguin paperback edition 2018)
Thirteen Ways to Smell a Tree, published in UK only, (Hachette 2021)
Sounds Wild and Broken, (Viking Books hardcover edition 2022, Penguin paperback edition 2023)
Essays and Op-eds

 "The sonic wonders of our world are under threat. We need to listen", New Scientist
 "Wild Sounds: The Loss of Sonic Diversity and Why It Matters", Yale Environment 360, 2022 
 "Music, Forest, Body", Orion Magazine, 2022
 "Humans Evolved to Play Music", Wired, 2022
 "The scent of trees: how to understand their language", The Financial Times, 2021
 "Eleven Ways of Smelling a Tree", Emergence Magazine, 2020
 "The Voices of Birds and the Language of Belonging", Emergence Magazine, 2019
 "Love Letter to a Forest" BBC Radio 4, 2019
 "The Most Wonderful Smelling Time of the Year", The New York Times, 2018
 "Central Park, Now More Delicious", The New York Times, 2018 
 "The Seasons Aren’t What They Used to Be", The New York Times, 2017
 "Listening to the Thoughts of the Forest", Undark Magazine
 "Nature’s Case for Same-Sex Marriage", The New York Times, 2013
Multimedia

 "When the Earth started to sing", Emergence Magazine, 2022, Written and narrated by David George Haskell, Sound design and mixing by Matt Mikkelsen, Produced by Emmanuel Vaughan-Lee
 "The Voices of Birds and the Language of Belonging", Emergence Magazine, 2019
 "The Atomic Tree", VR experience, 2019, Written by David G. Haskell, Adam Loften, and Emmanuel Vaughan-Lee, Directed and Produced by Adam Loften and Emmanuel Vaughan-Lee

References

External links

Official website

Living people
American science writers
Alumni of Keble College, Oxford
Cornell University alumni
British expatriate academics in the United States
Sewanee: The University of the South faculty
21st-century American biologists
American nature writers
American male non-fiction writers
Year of birth missing (living people)